Boslowick is a suburb on the western edge of Falmouth within Cornwall, England, United Kingdom.

Boslowick may derive its name from the house of that name, now a pub. For a full history of the house written by the daughter of the last private owners of the house before it became a pub

References

Villages in Cornwall
Populated coastal places in Cornwall